Gunnar Olof Johan Herrlin, Bishop of Visby 1962 - 1980, born 1914 in Lund, Sweden , died 1992. Bishop Herrlin was one of the leaders of High Church movement in Church of Sweden.

Selected works
Herrlin, Olof, Divine Service: Liturgy in Perspective. Fortress Press, 1966.

1914 births
1992 deaths
Bishops of Visby